Del Rendon (1965 – 2005) was an American rock and blues musician from Starkville, Mississippi, United States, whose music career spanned 20 years.  He toured throughout the southeastern United States and Nashville, Tennessee. He died on September 4, 2005.

Bands

The Downstroke
The Downstroke was together for one tape and one CD release.

Puerto Rican Rum Drunks
Rendon formed the Puerto Rican Rum Drunks in 1996.  Chameleon, the band's first release sold over 2,000 copies independently.

Legacy
Rendon is commemorated in the annual Del Rendon Music Festival, also known as DelFest. This is organised by the Del Rendon Foundation, which raises funds for a scholarship in his name at Mississippi State University.

Discography

The Downstroke
 The Downstroke
 Edna's Cafe

Puerto Rican Rum Drunks
 Chameleon
 Jelly for the Masses

References

External links 
 Del Rendon and the Puerto Rican Rum Drunks – Mississippi Writers and Musicians Project
 The Del Rendon Foundation

1965 births
American male singer-songwriters
American rock guitarists
American rock singers
American rock songwriters
American blues guitarists
American male guitarists
American blues singer-songwriters
20th-century American painters
American male painters
21st-century American painters
2005 deaths
20th-century American singers
20th-century American guitarists
20th-century American male singers
20th-century American male artists